Beata Kucharzewska (born 31 March 1976) is a Polish judoka. She competed in the women's lightweight event at the 1996 Summer Olympics.

References

External links
 

1976 births
Living people
Polish female judoka
Olympic judoka of Poland
Judoka at the 1996 Summer Olympics
People from Niemodlin